Rich & Cowan Ltd was a book publisher, based at 37 Bedford Square, London WC1.
They specialized in literary books.

Books 
 A Ghost in Monte Carlo by Barbara Cartland, (1951)
 Goethe: a play in four acts by S. M. and C. S. Fox, London,(1934)
 Form In Literature: a theory of technique and construction by Harold Weston (1934) 
 The Theatre In My Time by St. John Ervine, (1933)
 As I was going down Sackville Street by Oliver St John Gogarty (1937)
32 pages of advertisements for Rich & Cowan publications are printed in ''Form in Literature", (1939).

References 

Book publishing companies based in London